Dibrugarh Rajdhani Express is one of the premier train in the exclusive fleet of Rajdhani Expresses of Indian Railways.

History
 The first version of this train was inaugurated on 26 October 1996 as Guwahati Rajdhani Express which ran via Barauni. It was flagged off by Ram Vilas Paswan (former Minister of Railways) which runs as a weekly service. The frequency was later increased to tri-weekly in 1997.
 Later, on 11 January 1999, the Second set of Guwahati Rajdhani Express was inaugurated which runs through Chhapra. It was flagged off by Nitish Kumar (former Minister of Railways) which runs as a bi-weekly service.
 After that, on 24 March 2010, the third set of Guwahati Rajdhani Express was inaugurated which runs through Muzaffarpur. It was flagged off by Mamata Banerjee (former Minister of Railways) which runs as a weekly service.
 Later due to public demand in 2012, The three sets of Rajdhani was extended up to Dibrugarh and runs as Dibrugarh Rajdhani Express and also the frequency of First Set was increased to daily service.
February 2021:  20503/04 Dibrugarh Rajdhani frequency increased to 5 days a week from Weekly.

Route & halts
,.  to New Delhi.

Traction
In case of 20505/20506, the WAP-7 hauls the train from New Delhi to Rangiya and vice versa and the Diesel Loco Shed, Siliguri-based WDP-4 / WDP-4B / WDP-4D diesel locomotive takes over for its journey from Rangiya to Dibrugarh and vice versa.

Derailment
On 25 June 2014, this train derailed in Chhapra, Bihar, killing four people and seriously injuring eight. Sabotage by Naxalites was considered but ruled out as the cause of the crash. Also, on 6 December 2016 derailed in Allipurduar district of west Bengal.

Gallery

See also

Indian Railways
Express trains in India
List of named passenger trains of India

References

Transport in Delhi
Transport in Dibrugarh
Rail transport in Assam
Rail transport in Nagaland
Rail transport in West Bengal
Rail transport in Bihar
Rail transport in Uttar Pradesh
Rail transport in Delhi
Railway services introduced in 2010
Rajdhani Express trains